Ølgod is a railway town with a population of 3,705 (1 January 2022), at the railroad between Esbjerg and Struer, which was the seat of the former Ølgod Municipality (Danish, kommune) in Varde Municipality in Region of Southern Denmark on the Jutland peninsula in southwest Denmark.

Ølgod Church

Ølgod Church is built in the Romanesque style - presumably as a manor church - around year 1200. The church's tower was built around the year 1500, while the altarpiece is from 1596.

Museums

Ølgod Museum, located in the Culture House, tells the story of Danish agriculture, from poor heath farmers to democratic modern farmers.

Hjedding Andelsmejeri, situated about 2 km south of Ølgod, was the first cooperative dairy in Denmark, founded the 10th of June 1882. Now it is a museum where the machines that helped to revolutionize the Danish dairy operation are on display.

Ølgod Municipality

The former Ølgod Municipality covered an area of 247 km2, and had a total population of 11,351 (2005).  Ølgod Municipality's last mayor was Erik Buhl Nielsen.

On January 1, 2007, Ølgod municipality ceased to exist as the result of Kommunalreformen ("The Municipality Reform" of 2007).  It was merged with Blaabjerg, Blåvandshuk, Helle, and Varde municipalities to form a new Varde Municipality. Mads Sørensen is currently the mayor of Varde Municipality.

Notable people 
 Mette Magrete Tvistman (1741–1827) the first female clockmaker in Denmark. She had her own workshop  in Ølgod from 1787 to 1798
 Jacob Stilling-Andersen (1858 in Ølgod - 1933) a Danish dairy manager and businessman
 Jan Kristiansen (born 1981 in Ølgod) a retired Danish footballer with over 450 club appearances and 11 international appearances for Denmark.
 Lars Møller Madsen (born 1981 in Ølgod) a Danish team handball player who won the European Men's Handball Championship in 2008 with Denmark.
 Margrethe Vestager (born 1968) a Danish politician and European Commissioner. She grew up in Ølgod before moving to Copenhagen for a university education.
 Christian Rabjerg Madsen (born 1986) a Danish politician and former minister.

References

 Municipal statistics: NetBorger Kommunefakta, delivered from KMD aka Kommunedata (Municipal Data)
 Municipal mergers and neighbors: Eniro  new municipalities map

External links
 The new Varde municipality's official website (Danish only)

 Weather forecast Ølgod, Denmark weather-atlas.com

Former municipalities of Denmark
Cities and towns in the Region of Southern Denmark
Varde Municipality